Goggia, also known commonly as dwarf leaf-toed geckos or pygmy geckos, is a genus of African geckos, lizards in the family Gekkonidae.

Geographic range
Species in the genus Goggia are found in southern Africa.

Species
The following ten species are recognized as being valid.
Goggia braacki (Good, Bauer & Branch, 1996) – Braack's dwarf leaf-toed gecko  
Goggia essexi (Hewitt, 1925) – Essex's dwarf leaf-toed gecko
Goggia gemmula (Bauer, Branch & Good, 1996) – Richtersveld dwarf leaf-toed gecko
Goggia hewitti (Branch, Bauer & Good, 1995) – Hewitt's dwarf leaf-toed gecko
Goggia hexapora (Branch, Bauer & Good, 1995) – Cedarberg dwarf leaf-toed gecko
Goggia incognita 
Goggia lineata (Gray, 1838) – striped dwarf leaf-toed gecko
Goggia matzikamaensis 
Goggia microlepidota (V. FitzSimons, 1939) – small-scaled dwarf leaf-toed gecko 
Goggia rupicola (V. FitzSimons, 1938) – Namaqualand dwarf leaf-toed gecko

Nota bene: A binomial authority in parentheses indicates that the species was original described in a genus other than Goggia.

References

Further reading
Branch, Bill (2004). Field Guide to Snakes and other Reptiles of Southern Africa. Third Revised edition, Second Impression. Sanibel Island, Florida: Ralph Curtis Books. 399 pp. . (Genus Goggia, pp. 239–240).

External links

 
Geckos of Africa
Lizard genera
Taxa named by William Roy Branch